Gordon Sandison may refer to:
 Gordon Sandison (politician)
 Gordon Sandison (baritone)
 Gordon Sandison (trade unionist)